Sohrab Katrak Parsi Colony is one of the neighbourhoods of Jamshed Town in Karachi, Sindh, Pakistan.

History
In 1920, the Zoroastrians of Karachi bought 96,000 square yards of land to develop a Zoroastrian  neighbourhood. It was named after Sir Kawasji Hormasji Katrak. The plans were drawn whereby 58 plots, each measuring approximately 1000 square yard were laid out with wide roads and an amenity plot in the center for a garden and a library. By 1930s all the plots in the neighborhood were built by the Zoroastrians.

After the independence of Pakistan in 1947, thousands of Muslim migrated to Pakistan. The demographics of Sohrab Katrak Parsi Colony has changed over the years. Now the majority of population is Muslim.

There are several ethnic groups including Muhajirs, Punjabis, Sindhis, Kashmiris, Seraikis, Pakhtuns, Balochis, Memons, Bohras Ismailis and Christians.

References

External links 
 Karachi Website.

Neighbourhoods of Karachi
Jamshed Town
Zoroastrianism in Pakistan